Fatanpur may refer to:
Fatanpur, Moradabad, a village in Uttar Pradesh, India
Fatanpur, Pratapgarh, a village in Pratapgarh district, Uttar Pradesh, India